Abdul Hakim was a Bangladesh Awami League politician and the former Member of Parliament of Comilla-7.

Career
Ahmed was elected to parliament from Comilla-7 as a Bangladesh Awami League candidate in 1996.

Death
Hakim died on 23 March 2014.

References

Awami League politicians
2014 deaths
6th Jatiya Sangsad members
1929 births
Bangladesh Krishak Sramik Awami League central committee members